Aviației is a district divided between Sector 1 and Sector 2 of Bucharest, mainly in Sector 1. The name refers to aircraft or airforces. The names of aviation pioneers Traian Vuia, Aurel Vlaicu, and Henri Coandă are related to the name of the district.

In the 2000s, the area has become increasingly upmarket, due to the construction of various luxury apartment developments in and around it (as are those in the Pipera–Tunari area). It is also home to many villas constructed before the 1930s that were refurbished in the 1990s and 2000s.

Notable buildings:
 Oracle Tower
 Autoritatea pentru Valorificarea Activelor Statului (AVAS)
 Aviation Museum

The development of the district 

In the recent years, several business centers and bank offices were built in this area. In 2008, the Floreasca City Center complex (which includes a 37-story office building) was started. This development burdened road traffic and motivated the authorities to make the system more fluid. Thus, several streets have become one-way streets. 

Districts of Bucharest